France competed at the 1980 Summer Olympics in Moscow, USSR.  In partial support of the American-led boycott of the 1980 Summer Olympics, France competed under the Olympic Flag instead of its national flag. 121 competitors, 98 men and 23 women, took part in 85 events in 13 sports.

Medalists

Gold
 Thierry Rey — Judo, Men's Extra Lightweight (60 kg)
 Angelo Parisi — Judo, Men's Heavyweight
 Pascale Hachin-Trinquet — Fencing, Women's Foil Individual  
 Philippe Bonnin, Bruno Boscherie, Didier Flament, Pascal Jolyot and Frédéric Pietruszka — Fencing, Men's Foil Team Competition
 Philippe Boisse, Philippe Riboud, Patrick Picot, Hubert Gardas and Michel Salesse — Fencing, Men's Épée Team Competition
 Isabelle Bégard, Véronique Brouquier, Pascale Hachin-Trinquet, Brigitte Gaudin-Latrille and Christine Muzio — Fencing, Women's Foil Team Competition

Silver
 Alain Lebas — Canoeing, Men's K1 1.000 metres Kayak Singles
 Yavé Cahard — Cycling, Men's 1.000 metres Sprint (Scratch)
 Alain Bondue — Cycling, Men's 4.000 metres Individual Pursuit
 Pascal Jolyot — Fencing, Men's Foil Individual
 Angelo Parisi — Judo, Men's Open Class

Bronze
 Bernard Tchoullouyan — Judo, Men's Half Middleweight (78 kg)
 Philippe Riboud — Fencing, Men's Épée Individual
 Antoine Richard, Hermann Panzo, Patrick Barré and Pascal Barré — Athletics, Men's 4x100 metres Relay

Athletics

Men's 100 metres
Hermann Panzo
 Heat — 10.53
 Quarterfinals — 10.29
 Semifinals — 10.45
 Final — 10.49 (→ 8th place)
Antoine Richard
 Heat — 10.51
 Quarterfinals — 10.45 (→ did not advance)

Men's 200 metres
 Pascal Barré
 Heat — did not start (→ did not advance)

Men's 800 metres
José Marajo
 Heat — 1:49.6 
 Semifinals — 1:47.3
 Final — 1:47.3 (→ 7th place)
Roger Milhau
 Heat — 1:48.5 
 Semifinals — 1:48.1 (→ did not advance)
Philippe Dupont
 Heat — 1:49.6
 Semifinals — 1:49.7 (→ did not advance)

Men's 1,500 metres
José Marajo
 Heat — 3:43.9 
 Semifinals — 3:39.6
 Final — 3:41.5 (→ 7th place)
Alex Gonzalez
 Heat — 3:44.6
 Semifinals — 3:44.7 (→ did not advance)

Men's Marathon
 Jean-Michel Charbonnel
 Final — did not finish (→ no ranking)

Men's 4x400 metres Relay
 Jacques Fellice, Robert Froissart, Didier Dubois, and Francis Demarthon
 Heat — 3:05.4
 Final — 3:04.8 (→ 4th place)

Men's 50 km Walk
Gérard Lelièvre
 Final — did not finish (→ no ranking)

Men's High Jump
Francis Agbo
 Qualification — 2.18 m (→ did not advance)

Men's Long Jump
 Philippe Deroche
 Qualification — 7.90 m
 Final — 7.77 m (→ 10th place)

Men's Triple Jump
Christian Valetudie
 Qualification — 16.43 m
 Final — no mark (→ no ranking)

Men's Pole Vault
 Philippe Houvion
 Qualification — 5.35 m
 Final — 5.65 m (→ 4th place)
 Jean-Michel Bellot
 Qualification — 5.40 m
 Final — 5.60 m (→ 5th place)
 Thierry Vigneron
 Qualification — 5.40 m
 Final — 5.45 m (→ 7th place)

Women's 100 metres
 Chantal Réga
 Heat — 11.53
 Quarterfinals — 11.40
 Semifinals — 11.36
 Final — 11.32 (→ 7th place)
 Emma Sulter
 Heat — 11.56
 Quarterfinals — 11.48
 Semifinals — 11.63 (→ did not advance)
 Laureen Beckles
 Heat — 11.59
 Quarterfinals — 11.54
 Semifinals — 11.70 (→ did not advance)

Women's 100 m Hurdles
 Laurence Elloy
 Heat — 13.60
 Semifinal — 13.33 (→ did not advance)
 Laurence Le Beau
 Heat — 13.18
 Semifinal — 13.54 (→ did not advance)

Women's Pentathlon
 Florence Picaut — 4424 points (→ 9th place)
 100 metres — 13.75s
 Shot Put — 13.24m 
 High Jump — 1.80m 
 Long Jump — 5.83m 
 800 metres — 2:16.70

Boxing

Men's Bantamweight (– 54 kg)
 Ali Ben Maghenia
 First Round — Bye
 Second Round — Defeated Pushkardhoj Shahi (Nepal) walk-over
 Third Round — Lost to John Siryakibbe (Uganda) on points (0-5)

Men's Featherweight (– 57 kg)
 Daniel Londas
 First Round — Bye
 Second Round — Lost to Viktor Rybakov (Soviet Union) on points (0-5)

Canoeing

Cycling

Nine cyclists represented France in 1980. Alain Bondue won a silver medal in the individual pursuit.

Individual road race
 Christian Faure
 Marc Madiot
 Francis Castaing
 Régis Clère

Sprint
 Yavé Cahard

1000m time trial
 Yavé Cahard

Individual pursuit
 Alain Bondue

Team pursuit
 Alain Bondue
 Philippe Chevalier
 Pascal Poisson
 Jean-Marc Rebière

Diving

Fencing

16 fencers, 11 men and 5 women, represented France in 1980.

Men's foil
 Pascal Jolyot
 Frédéric Pietruszka
 Didier Flament

Men's team foil
 Frédéric Pietruszka, Didier Flament, Pascal Jolyot, Philippe Bonin, Bruno Boscherie

Men's épée
 Philippe Riboud
 Philippe Boisse
 Patrick Picot

Men's team épée
 Philippe Boisse, Hubert Gardas, Philippe Riboud, Patrick Picot, Michel Salesse

Men's sabre
 Jean-François Lamour

Women's foil
 Pascale Trinquet-Hachin
 Brigitte Latrille-Gaudin
 Véronique Brouquier

Women's team foil
 Pascale Trinquet-Hachin, Brigitte Latrille-Gaudin, Christine Muzio, Isabelle Boéri-Bégard, Véronique Brouquier

Gymnastics

Judo

Modern pentathlon

Three male pentathletes represented France in 1980.

Men's Individual Competition:
 Paul Four — 5.196 pts (→ 12th place)
 Joël Bouzou — 5.107 pts (→ 20th place)
 Alain Cortes — 5.042 pts (→ 23rd place)

Men's Team Competition:
 Four, Bouzou, and Cortes — 15.345 pts (→ 5th place)

Rowing

Swimming

Men's 100m Freestyle
 René Ecuyer
 Heats — 52,09
 Semi-Finals — 51,62
 Final — 52,01 (→ 7th place)

Men's 200m Freestyle
 Mark Lazzaro
 Heats — DNS
 Paskal Laget
 Heats — 1.56,01 (→ did not advance)
 Fabien Noël
 Heats — 1.53,25 (→ did not advance)

Men's 100m Butterfly
 Xavier Savin
 Final — 55,66 (→ 7th place)

Men's 4 × 200 m Freestyle Relay
 Fabien Noël, Mark Lazzaro, Dominique Petit, and Paskal Laget
 Final — 7.36,08 (→ 8th place)

Men's 4 × 100 m Medley Relay
 Frédéric Delcourt, Olivier Borios, Xavier Savin, and René Ecuyer
 Final — 3.49,19 (→ 5th place)

Women's 100m Freestyle
 Guylaine Berger
 Final — 57,88 (→ 7th place)

Women's 100m Breaststroke
 Catherine Poirot
 Heats — 1:12.94 (→ did not advance)

Weightlifting

Wrestling

References

Nations at the 1980 Summer Olympics
1980
Summer Olympics